Konstantowo may refer to the following places in Kuyavian-Pomeranian Voivodeship, Poland:

Konstantowo, Nakło County
Konstantowo, Świecie County